Adolf Fierla (16 January 1908 – 8 September 1967) was a Polish writer and poet from the region of Cieszyn Silesia.

Life and career
He was born 16 January 1908 in Orlová to a coal miner's family and graduated from the local Juliusz Słowacki Polish Gymnasium. Fierla later studied Polish studies at the Jagiellonian University in Kraków and Slavic studies in Prague. He later worked as a teacher of Polish language at Polish elementary schools in Zaolzie and eventually at the Polish Gymnasium in Orlová.

When World War II broke out Fierla fled like many other Poles to the east. After his return Nazi German authorities jailed him in 1940 and incarcerated in Dachau and later in Mauthausen-Gusen concentration camps. Released from the camp, he worked as a worker in Pietwałd. In 1944 Fierla was forced to join the German Army and was captured in France by the British forces. Fierla then stayed in the Western Europe, initially in Italy, where he taught in lyceum for Polish girls in Porto San Giorgio; in France, where he taught in one of Polish gymnasiums, and then from 1958 in the United Kingdom. He continued his literary life there cooperating with Polish press and several other organizations of which he was a member, e.g. Zrzeszenie Ewangelików Polaków w Wielkiej Brytanii (Association of Polish Protestants in the United Kingdom). Fierla died on 8 September 1967 in London and is buried in the Finchley district of London.

Fierla wrote his works in literary Polish and also in Cieszyn Silesian dialect. He focused mainly on the life of the people of Cieszyn Silesia, especially those of the Beskids mountain ranges and coal basin around the city of Karviná. His works includes many religious motives. Fierla also translated the works of Czech poet Jiří Wolker to Polish.

Fierla's typical motive of his native coal mining region can be observed in the Kopalnie (Coal Mines) poem from his debut poetry collection Przydrożne kwiaty (Roadside Flowers):

Works
 Przydrożne kwiaty (1928) — poetry collection
 Ondraszek (1930/1931) — novel
 Cienie i blaski (1931) — poetry collection
 Hałdy i inne opowiadania górnicze (1931) — short stories collection
 Dziwy na groniach (1932) — poetry collection
 Kopalnia słoneczna (1933) — poetry collection
 Kolędy beskidzkie (1935)
 Kamień w polu (1938) — short stories collection
 Poezje religijne (1971)

Footnotes

References
 

 

 

 

 

1908 births
1967 deaths
Jagiellonian University alumni
People from Orlová
Polish people from Zaolzie
Polish Lutherans
Polish educators
German Army personnel of World War II
Dachau concentration camp survivors
Mauthausen concentration camp survivors
20th-century Polish poets
20th-century Polish male writers
Polish emigrants to the United Kingdom
20th-century Lutherans
German prisoners of war in World War II held by the United Kingdom